Jiménez Municipality is a municipality located in the Mexican state of Tamaulipas. It was founded on February 17, 1749 as Santander by Pedro Saldívar Cantú in recognition of his Basque Spanish roots. By decree of the State Congress on October 31, 1827, Santander was renamed Jiménez to honor the memory of "'Colonel Juan Nepomuceno Jiménez"'.

References

External links
Gobierno Municipal de Jiménez Official website

Municipalities of Tamaulipas